Tribute to the Martyrs is the second studio album by English roots reggae band Steel Pulse, released in 1979; it was produced after their previous Handsworth Revolution album. The band became well known after the two albums.

Track listing
All songs written by David Hinds, except where noted.
"Unseen Guest"
"Sound System"
"Jah Pickney - R.A.R."
"Tribute to the Martyrs"
"Babylon Makes the Rules" (Selwyn Brown)
"Uncle George"
"Biko's Kindred Lament"
"Blasphemy (Selah)"

Personnel
Steel Pulse
with:
Godfrey Maduro - saxophone
Dick "Dickage" Cuthell - flugelhorn, cornet
Rico - trombone
Satch Dixon
Technical
Godwin Logie - engineer
Pete King - executive producer, management
Jene Hawkins - cover illustration

References

1979 albums
Steel Pulse albums
Mango Records albums